Maskun Palloseura (abbreviated Masku) is a football club from Masku, Finland. The club was formed in 1988 and their home ground is Taponkedon kenttä.  The men's football first team currently plays in the Kakkonen (Third tier in Finland).

External links
Official Website

References

Football clubs in Finland
Association football clubs established in 1988
1988 establishments in Finland